Vernon Eversfield Morgan (2 May 1904 – 23 October 1992) was an English athlete who competed for Great Britain in the 1928 Summer Olympics.

He was born in Bucklow Hill, Cheshire and died in Wisborough Green.

In 1928 he was eliminated in the first round of the 3000 metre steeplechase event.

At the 1930 British Empire Games he won the bronze medal in the 2 miles steeplechase competition.

He later became sports editor of the global news agency Reuters, a position he held for about 30 years.

References
sports-reference.com

1904 births
1992 deaths
Sportspeople from Cheshire
English male long-distance runners
British male steeplechase runners
English male steeplechase runners
Olympic athletes of Great Britain
Athletes (track and field) at the 1928 Summer Olympics
Commonwealth Games bronze medallists for England
Commonwealth Games medallists in athletics
Athletes (track and field) at the 1930 British Empire Games
People from Wisborough Green
Medallists at the 1930 British Empire Games